Gretchen Magbanua Abaniel (born November 4, 1985) is a Filipino professional boxer. She held the WIBA mini-flyweight title from 2009 to 2011 and the WIBF mini-flyweight title from 2015 to 2016. She has also challenged for multiple major world titles across three weight classes; the WBA, IBF and WBO female mini-flyweight titles between 2008 and 2017; the WBA female atomweight title in 2013; and the WBO female light-flyweight title in 2018.

Early life
Abaniel's father thought she should learn martial arts like karate and she later grew interested in boxing, joining the national team to start her amateur career. Abaniel is a Seventh-day Adventist.

Boxing career

Amateur
Abaniel, a resident of Puerto Princesa, has been supported by her town's mayor, Edward Hagedorn, throughout her career, even when becoming part of the Philippine national team in 2003 due to inadequate support from the Philippine Sports Commission. As an amateur boxer competing for her country, Abaniel won a bronze medal at the 2005 Women's World Amateur Boxing Championships in Russia. She has also won titles in tournaments held in Taiwan.

Professional
Citing lack of support from the government, Abaniel turned professional in 2006.

Abaniel won her first world title match against Thailand's Nongbua Lookpraiaree after a tenth-round unanimous decision allowed her to capture the vacant Women's International Boxing Association World minimumweight title. She lost her title to Samson Tor Buamas in Sukhothai, Thailand on February 19, 2011.

2015 Abaniel won her match in Ludwigsburg MHP Arena, Ludwigsburg, Baden-Württemberg, Germany, against undefeated hometown favorite, German-Turkish Oezlem Sahin for the WIBF/GBU world light flyweight title. Judges scored (96-94,94-96,99-91) granting her a split decision victory.

Professional boxing record

Titles and Accomplishment
WIBA Women's International Boxing Association Minimumweight title (2009, 2014, 2016)WBC International female minimumweight title (2007)

Other Titles:WIBA Minimumweight Intercontinental TitleWomen's International Boxing Federation World Minimumweight titleGlobal Boxing Union Female World Minimumweight title

Appearances in media
She was a contestant on the television program The Amazing Race Philippines 2, being a part of an athleticism focused duo with Luz McClitton. She was also a guest on a morning news-talk program called GMK  conceptualized by Daniel Razon.

She also participated on a Philippine variety show called It's Showtime:Trabahula on March 10, 2016

See also
List of The Amazing Race Philippines contestants

References

External links

1985 births
Living people
Filipino women boxers
People from Puerto Princesa
Sportspeople from Palawan
Filipino Seventh-day Adventists
Atomweight boxers
The Amazing Race contestants